The 1957 winners of the Torneo di Viareggio (in English, the Viareggio Tournament, officially the Viareggio Cup World Football Tournament Coppa Carnevale), the annual youth football tournament held in Viareggio, Tuscany, are listed below.

Format
The 8 teams are organized in knockout rounds. The round of 8 are played in two-legs, while the rest of the rounds are single tie.

Participating teams

Italian teams

  Fiorentina
  Lanerossi Vicenza
  Milan
  Roma
  Udinese
  Sampdoria

European teams

  Partizan Beograd
  Dukla Praha

Tournament fixtures

Champions

Footnotes

External links
 Official Site (Italian)
 Results on RSSSF.com

1957
1956–57 in Italian football
1956–57 in Yugoslav football
1956–57 in Czechoslovak football